List of assets owned by General Electric:

Primary business units
 GE Aviation
 GE Healthcare
 GE Power
 GE Renewable Energy

Other business units
 GE Additive
 GE Capital
 GE Capital Aviation Services
 GE Energy Financial Services
 GE Digital
 GE Research
 GE Licensing

See also
 Lists of corporate assets

References

Sources
 http://www.ge.com

General Electric
General E
Assets